This is the discography of J-pop singer Aco.

Studio albums

Compilations albums

Extended plays

Live albums

Remix albums

Singles

As lead artist

As featured artist

Promotional singles

Guest appearances

Songwriting credits

VHS/DVD
1821 - 
Absolute Live - 
Heart o Moyashite - 
Shigatsu no Hero - 
2224 -

References

External links 
 ACO official website

Pop music discographies
Discographies of Japanese artists